Sergio Daniel Perez (born December 5, 1984) is an American professional baseball player who is currently a free agent.

Career
Sergio Perez is a graduate out of University of Tampa. In 2006, he was drafted by the Houston Astros in the 2nd round.

He has played in the off-season with the Venezuelan Professional Baseball League for several seasons and has helped the Navegantes del Magallanes go into the playoffs.

He played for the Spain national baseball team in the 2013 World Baseball Classic.

On March 16, 2013, he signed a minor league contract with the Oakland Athletics.

On March 4, 2014, he signed a minor league contract with the Tampa Bay Rays.

References

External links

1984 births
Living people
Águilas del Zulia players
American expatriate baseball players in Mexico
Baseball players from Tampa, Florida
Corpus Christi Hooks players
Lexington Legends players
Long Island Ducks players
Mexican League baseball pitchers
Midland RockHounds players
Navegantes del Magallanes players
American expatriate baseball players in Venezuela
Round Rock Express players
Oklahoma City RedHawks players
Pericos de Puebla players
Salem Avalanche players
Scottsdale Scorpions players
Stockton Ports players
Tigres de Aragua players
2013 World Baseball Classic players